Dent Hardware Company Factory Complex, also known as the D.W. Coombs Textile Machinery Company, is a historic factory complex located in Whitehall Township in Lehigh County, Pennsylvania.  It was built between 1894 and 1913, and consists of 11 contributing buildings.  They are built of reinforced concrete.  The company was the nation's leading producer of brass refrigerator hardware and one of the two largest producers of cast iron toys in Pennsylvania.

It was added to the National Register of Historic Places in 1986.

References

External links
History of Dent Design & Hardware

Industrial buildings and structures on the National Register of Historic Places in Pennsylvania
Buildings and structures in Lehigh County, Pennsylvania
National Register of Historic Places in Lehigh County, Pennsylvania